Megalonisi, also Nisiopi, is a long island near the west coast of the island Lesbos, North Aegean, Greece. It is situated in front of Sigri's harbour, and stretches across the mouth of the bay and acts as a buffer to the prevailing winds. In the middle stands Megalonisi Lighthouse to help ships navigate in the rough east Aegean Sea.

References 

Islands of Greece
Landforms of Lesbos
Islands of the North Aegean